Yugoslavia participated at the Eurovision Song Contest 1987, held in Brussels, Belgium. It was represented by song "Ja sam za ples", performed by band Novi fosili. The selection process used a revised system for nominations and scoring. In the Contest itself the song was ranked fourth out of 22, winning 92 points.

Before Eurovision

Jugovizija 1987 
The Yugoslav national final to select their entry for the Eurovision Song Contest was held on 7 March 1987 at the Sava Centre in Belgrade, and was hosted by Dejan Đurović and Ivana Stanković.

In 1987, new controversial procedures were introduced about the selection of the songs and voting, which remained in force until the last all-Yugoslav pre-selection in 1991. All TV studios nominated two songs as guaranteed participants (a total of 16) and 8 more were selected based on their quality. Some of the studios did not enter any extra songs chosen, while TV Zagreb entered four, making six in total (Two of these were the top scorers, while another two won no points). The total of 24 songs competing was the greatest number for the period 1981-1991. The new voting system allowed the juries of the individual TV studios to be able to vote for their own entries, and most of them took this opportunity, as they did in the following four years. Every jury member (3 from each TV studio – 24 in total) could vote only for five songs, and this marginalized many of the songs, with five songs failing to win any points.

The winning entry was "Ja sam za ples", performed by Novi fosili, composed by Rajko Dujmić and written by Stevo Cvikić.

At Eurovision
Yugoslavia performed 21st on the night of the contest, following Ireland and preceding Switzerland. At the close of the voting the song had received 92 points, placing 4th in a field of 22 competing countries. The 12 points from the Yugoslav jury were awarded to Italy.

The members of the Yugoslav jury included Fedor Janušić, Valentina Miovska, Ljubiša Terzić, Vera Županić, Ljiljana Ljolja, Mirjana Vukčević, Karolina Savić, Branislav Kitanović, Dušan Cincar, Dimitrije Savić, and Slobodanka Veselinović.

Voting

References

1987
Countries in the Eurovision Song Contest 1987
Eurovision